Fotonovela is a 2008 Spanish-language comedy film directed by Robert Kubilos that was released in the autumn of 2008 (September 16). Its budget is estimated to $150,000. The movie was released on DVD at the same time. It lasts 90 minutes and it is produced under Maya Entertainment.

It stars Rafael Amaya, Elizabeth Gutiérrez and Veronica Diaz.

Plot
Angel Guzman is a Mexican immigrant in the U.S. But, rather than seek work as a laborer, he dreams of fulfilling his artistic passions. When the aspiring young Angel wins a radio contest and becomes an intern to one of L.A.'s premiere photographers, he is convinced that this chance of a lifetime will jump start his career. But, on set, things prove to be more complicated! It turns out that he is not very welcomed by some of his colleagues and possibly too welcomed by some of the ladies. Angel struggles to please a tyrannical boss while dodging the flirtations and temptations of twelve super models. Comedy and romance ensue as Angel finds his place in the world of photography and in the heart of a special woman. At the end, he gets Melanie.

Cast
Rafael Amaya ... Angel
Elizabeth Gutiérrez ... Melanie
Veronica Diaz ... Isabel
Robert Kubilos ... Claudio
Richie Mestre ... Julio
Rene Pereyra ... Paco
Noelle Perris ... Olga
Aida Rodriguez ... Ida
Alex Ruiz ... Raul
Rodrigo Vidal ... Charlie
Angel Zermen ... Luis

References

http://www.amazon.com/Fotonovela-Rafael-Amaya/dp/B001I9HQC2
http://www.cinemagia.ro/filme/fotonovela-446059/
http://www.cinemarx.ro/filme/Fotonovela-Fotonovela-2364458.html

External links

2008 comedy films
2008 films
Films directed by Robert Kubilos